Vicki Young (born ) is a British journalist.

She has been the deputy political editor of BBC News since October 2020. She was formerly the chief political correspondent and has contributed to BBC coverage of seven general elections. She has occasionally served as a relief presenter on the BBC News channel.

Early life
Young attended Truro High School for Girls, finishing in 1988. During her senior years she was head girl at the school. She then attended New Hall, Cambridge.

Career
Young's career at the BBC began as a reporter at BBC Wales before joining the One O'Clock News as a political correspondent. She was a correspondent for BBC Breakfast from 2008 to 2011. In 2015, Young was promoted to the role of BBC News' chief political correspondent. She was given the position in response to Norman Smith's promotion to assistant political editor. In 2014, she served as a sit-in reporter for Daily Politics and has also reported for BBC Radio 4 and BBC Radio 5 Live. In 2020 she was appointed as deputy political editor.

References

External links

 Vicki Young on Twitter
 

1970 births
Living people
People educated at Truro High School
Alumni of New Hall, Cambridge
BBC newsreaders and journalists
British political journalists
British radio journalists
British television journalists
21st-century British journalists